Leucate is a commune in the Aude department in southern France. It lies between the Mediterranean Sea and the lagoon Étang de Leucate.

Geography

Leucate is on the Mediterranean coast of France. It is part of the eastern Corbières Massif, which are called the Corbières maritimes.

On a clear day, the Phare du Cap Leucate offers a view over the French Mediterranean Sea from the Spanish border to the south to the Camargue to the east.

Population

Urban Morphology
The town stretches over five tourist attractions, from north to south:
 La Franqui,
 Leucate village,
 Leucate beach (Leucate plage)
 The naturist village (Village naturiste) on the island of Correggio
 Port-Leucate.

Personalities
 Henry de Monfreid, adventurer and author
 Françoise de Cezelli (1558–1615) knight and French female war hero
 André Héléna (1919–1972) author
 Jacques Hiron author (fiction, comics, regional & local history and geography)
 Christophe Neff geographer

See also
 Fitou AOC
 Corbières AOC
 Communes of the Aude department

Sources
 Nöel Hautemanière and Jacques Hiron: Leucate : plein cadre; livre de photographies. Toreilles, 2004, .
 Christophe Neff: Kulturlandschaftswandel, Fremdenverkehr und Biodiversität auf der Halbinsel Leucate (Dept. Aude / Frankreich). In: Fremdenverkehrsgebiete des Mittelmeerraumes im Umbruch. Beiträge der Tagung des Arbeitskreises "Geographische Mittelmeerländer-Forschung“ vom 11.-13. Oktober 1996 in Regensburg. Regensburger Geographische Schriften, Heft 27, S. 99-135, Regensburg, 1998, 
 Christophe Neff : Observation géographiques et floristiques sur la presqu'île de Leucate. In: Bul. Soc. Et. Sc. Nat. Nîmes et Gard, T. 62, 1999, 23-34.
 Christophe Neff and Peter Frankenberg : Reflexions géobotaniques sur les plantes échappees de jardins: L´example de Euphorbia dendroides et d´autres espèces ornementales dans la région de Leucate et dans les Corbières maritimes (Aude, France). In : Bul. Soc. Et. Sc. Nat. Nîmes et Gard, T. 63, 2001, 7- 10.
 Christophe Neff : Les Corbières maritimes – forment-elles un étage de végétation méditerranéenne thermophile masqué par la pression humaine ? In: Eric Fouache (Edit.): The Mediterranean World Environment and History. IAG Working Group on Geo-archeology, Symposium Proceedings. Environmental Dynamics and History in Mediterranean Areas, Paris, Université de Paris – Sorbonne 24 – 26 avril 2002. Paris, 2003, 191 – 202, (Elsevier France).

References

External links

 Leucate.net 

Communes of Aude